In Aztec mythology, the  ( or : the "Four Hundred Mimixcoa", Cloud Serpents) are the gods of the northern stars. They are sons of Camaxtle-Mixcoatl with the Earth Goddess (Tlaltecuhtli or Coatlicue), according to the Codex Ramírez, or Tonatiuh (the Fifth Sun) with Chalchiuhtlicue, the goddess of the seas.

According to the Manuscript of 1558, section 6, these 400 'Cloud-Serpents' were divinely slain [transformed into stars] in this wise; of their five protagonists:
  ('Eagle's Twin') "hid inside a tree"; 
  ('Cloud Serpent') "hid within the earth"; 
  ('Hawk Mountain') "hid within a hill"; 
  ('River Lord') "hid in the water"; 
 their sister, "hid in the ball-court."

From this ambuscade, these 5 slew the 400.

In Ce Tecpatl, after the Creation of the Fifth Sun in Teotihuacan, Camaxtle-Mixcoatl, one of the four gods, ascended to the Eighth Heaven and created four men and one woman to feed the Sun, but barely formed, they fell into the water, they returned to the sky and there was no war; frustrated by this attempt, Camaxtle struck a cane on a rock, and at the blow, 400 Chichimecs Mimixcoa sprouted that populated the earth before the Aztecs. Camaxtle was able to do penance on the rock, drawing blood with maguey spikes, tongue and ears, and prayed to the gods that the four men and one woman created in the eighth heaven would come down to kill the barbarians to feed to the Sun.

The four men and one woman created in the Eighth Heaven are the five Mimixcoa who would later sacrifice the 400 Mimixcoa called Chichimecs or Otomies.

In Ce Tecpatl, the Mimixcoa were born, their mother Iztac-Chalchiuhtlicue went into a cave (Chicomoztoc or Tlalocan) and gave birth to five other Mimixcoa called Cuauhtlicoauh, Mixcoatl, Cuitlachcihuatl, Tlotepe and Apantecuhtli. After spending four days in the water, the five Mimixcoa were suckled by Mecitli, who, by the text, identifies with the Earth Goddess (Tlaltecuhtli or Coatlicue), and, immediately, the Sun ordered the 400 Mimixcoa; the Sun, Tonatiuh, gives them arrows and says "Here it is with what they will serve me to drink, with what they will feed, and a shield, and the precious arrows cast in quetzal  feathers, in heron-rowing feathers, in  feathers of zacuam, in tlauhquechol  feathers, and in xiuhtototl  feathers; and also, she, the Earth (Tlaltecuhtli or Coatlicue), who is your mother", but the Centzon Mimixcoa did not do their duty; instead, they get drunk on tzihuactli wine - a small maguey and have sex with women, and immediately, the Sun also orders the five who were born last, immediately gives them the maguey arrow and gives them the divine shield. The five Mimixcoa climb a mesquite tree where the 400 discover them, and they exclaim: "Who are these who are such as us?", and then the five hide in specific places: Cuauhtlicoauh takes shelter in a tree, Mixcoatl on the ground, Tlotepe in the mount, Apantecuhtli in the water, and Cuitlachcihuatl in a court of the Tlachtli ball-court. Finally, the Centzon Mimixcoa are defeated by his five younger brothers, who served the Sun, Tonatiuh, and gave him a drink.

References 

Aztec gods
Stellar gods
Aztec mythology and religion
Mesoamerican mythology and religion